In mathematics, a geometric progression, also known as a geometric sequence, is a sequence of non-zero numbers where each term after the first is found by multiplying the previous one by a fixed, non-zero number called the common ratio. For example, the sequence 2, 6, 18, 54, ... is a geometric progression with common ratio 3. Similarly 10, 5, 2.5, 1.25, ... is a geometric sequence with common ratio 1/2.

Examples of a geometric sequence are powers rk of a fixed non-zero number r, such as 2k and 3k. The general form of a geometric sequence is

where r ≠ 0 is the common ratio and a ≠ 0 is a scale factor, equal to the sequence's start value.
The sum of a geometric progression terms is called a geometric series.

Elementary properties
The n-th term of a geometric sequence with initial value a = a1 and common ratio r is given by

and in general

Such a geometric sequence also follows the recursive relation
 for every integer 

Generally, to check whether a given sequence is geometric, one simply checks whether successive entries in the sequence all have the same ratio.

The common ratio of a geometric sequence may be negative, resulting in an alternating sequence, with numbers alternating between positive and negative. For instance
1, −3, 9, −27, 81, −243, ...
is a geometric sequence with common ratio −3.

The behaviour of a geometric sequence depends on the value of the common ratio.
If the common ratio is:
 positive, the terms will all be the same sign as the initial term.
 negative, the terms will alternate between positive and negative.
 greater than 1, there will be exponential growth towards positive or negative infinity (depending on the sign of the initial term).
 1, the progression is a constant sequence.
 between −1 and 1 but not zero, there will be exponential decay towards zero (→ 0).
 −1, the absolute value of each term in the sequence is constant and terms alternate in sign.
 less than −1, for the absolute values there is exponential growth towards (unsigned) infinity, due to the alternating sign.

Geometric sequences (with common ratio not equal to −1, 1 or 0) show exponential growth or exponential decay, as opposed to the linear growth (or decline) of an arithmetic progression such as 4, 15, 26, 37, 48, … (with common difference 11). This result was taken by T.R. Malthus as the mathematical foundation of his Principle of Population.
Note that the two kinds of progression are related: exponentiating each term of an arithmetic progression yields a geometric progression, while taking the logarithm of each term in a geometric progression with a positive common ratio yields an arithmetic progression.

An interesting result of the definition of the geometric progression is that any three consecutive terms a, b and c will satisfy the following equation:

where b is considered to be the geometric mean  between a and c.

Geometric series

Product
The product of a geometric progression is the product of all terms. It can be quickly computed by taking the geometric mean of the progression's first and last individual terms, and raising that mean to the power given by the number of terms. (This is very similar to the formula for the sum of terms of an arithmetic sequence: take the arithmetic mean of the first and last individual terms, and multiply by the number of terms.)

As the geometric mean of two numbers equals the square root of their product, the product of a geometric progression is:

.

(An interesting aspect of this formula is that, even though it involves taking the square root of a potentially-odd power of a potentially-negative , it cannot produce a complex result if neither  nor  has an imaginary part. It is possible, should  be negative and  be odd, for the square root to be taken of a negative intermediate result, causing a subsequent intermediate result to be an imaginary number.

Proof

Let  represent the product. By definition, one calculates it by explicitly multiplying each individual term together. Written out in full,

.

Carrying out the multiplications and gathering like terms,

.

Substituting the formula for that calculation,

,

which enables simplifying the expression to

.

,

which concludes the proof.

History
A clay tablet from the Early Dynastic Period in Mesopotamia, MS 3047, contains a geometric progression with base 3 and multiplier 1/2. It has been suggested to be Sumerian, from the city of Shuruppak. It is the only known record of a geometric progression from before the time of Babylonian mathematics.

Books VIII and IX of Euclid's Elements analyzes geometric progressions (such as the powers of two, see the article for details) and give several of their properties.

See also

References

Hall & Knight, Higher Algebra, p. 39,

External links

Derivation of formulas for sum of finite and infinite geometric progression at Mathalino.com
Geometric Progression Calculator 
Nice Proof of a Geometric Progression Sum at sputsoft.com

Sequences and series
Mathematical series
Articles containing proofs